Bernard Carey was an American politician who served as Cook County State's Attorney from 1972 through 1980. Afterwards, he would serve on the Cook County Board of Commissioners and as a judge on the Circuit Court of Cook County.

A Republican, he was twice elected (in 1972 and 1976) State's Attorney in strongly Democratic Cook County, Illinois. In 1980, Carey was narrowly unseated by Democrat Richard M. Daley.

Early life and education
Carey was the son of a school principal.

Carey graduated from De La Salle Institute in 1952. He graduated from Saint Mary's University of Minnesota. He graduated from DePaul University College of Law in 1958.

While he would later be a Republican politician, during his time at Saint Mary's University of Minnesota he chaired the school's chapter of Young Democrats.

Early career
Carey worked as an agent of the Federal Bureau of Investigation. He met Joseph I. Woods while working there. Woods hired Carey to serve as his undersheriff, and also ushered him into Republican Party politics.

Working for Richard B. Ogilvie, Carey worked in Illinois state government, being selected by Ogilvie to organize the Illinois Bureau of Investigation in 1969.

1970 Cook County Sheriff campaign
In 1970, Carey was drafted to run as the Republican nominee for Cook County Sheriff, after incumbent Republican Joseph I. Woods opted  to run for president of the Cook County Board of Commissioners instead of the seeking a second term. Carey narrowly lost the election to Democrat Richard Elrod. Ogilvie had been among those that had encouraged Carey to run for the office.

Cook County State's Attorney

1972 election
In 1972, Carey was nominated by the Republican Party for Cook County State's Attorney.

His victory over incumbent Democrat Edward Hanrahan was attributed largely to African-American voters' outrage over the 1969 police killings of Black Panther Party leaders Fred Hampton and Mark Clark under Hanrahan's leadership. Hanrahan had also been facing charges of conspiracy to obstruct justice relating to these killings until being acquitted the day before the general election.

Hanrahan had won the Democratic Party's primary, and thereby its nomination, despite the Cook County Democratic Party, led by Chicago Mayor Richard J. Daley, refusing to back his bid for reelection and supporting a primary challenger to him.

Carey's campaign was managed by Don Rose.

Carey won most of Chicago's black wards, which largely since the 1930s had typically been won by Democratic candidates in elections. He performed competitively in all fourteen black wards, and won ten of them.

Carey ran as a reformer. Carey had pledged that he would investigate allegations of voter fraud, political corruption, kickbacks, and other crimes by the Democratic establishment of Chicago and Cook County.

Carey ran what was described as an "understated" campaign.

As a candidate, Carey referred himself as, "a professional , not a politician".

Tenure
Among the investigations Carey launched was a police spying scandal, involving the  so-called "Red Squad" of the Chicago Police Department infiltrating public organizations. Ultimately, after eleven years of litigation that arose, a 1985 court decision would end the Chicago Police Department's unlawful surveillance of political dissenters and their organizations.

Carey would receive praise for running an honest department as state's attorney.

Carey has received credit for lying the groundwork for the investigation that would become Operation Greylord.

Carey's office was in change of the prosecution of serial killer John Wayne Gacy.

Under Carey, the office doubled its number of attorneys to around 500 and expanded its felony review program. It also quadrupled its felony cases.

After Carey's 2018 death, Richard A. Devine, a Democrat who had served as Cook County State's Attorney from 1996 through 2008, remarked, "Bernie was a good guy. He worked hard to do a good job. He recruited professional prosecutors."

In 1976, he was reelected over Edward J. Egan, a Democrat who had stepped down from the Illinois Appellate Court in order to run against Carey. Egan had been recruited by Richard J. Daley to run against Carey. Carey campaigned against Egan, in part, by tying him to Richard J. Daley. Carey won what was seen as a strong victory, even carrying every single township of suburban Cook County. Carey was the first Republican to win multiple terms as Cook County state's attorney.

In 1980, Carey was narrowly unseated by Democrat Richard M. Daley, the son of the late Richard J. Daley.

Subsequent career
In 1982, Carey ran for both as the Republican nominee for President of the Cook County Board of Commissioners and a Republican nominee to be a member of the Cook County Board of Commissioners from suburban Cook County. He lost the race for president, but won election to be a member of the board.

In 1986, Carey made an unsuccessful run for Illinois Attorney General, replacing James T. Ryan as the Republican nominee after Ryan withdrew from the race due to domestic violence allegations. This meant that Carey had to withdraw from the race to win reelection to the Cook County Board of Commissioners, thus meaning his tenure on the board ended that December.

In May 1988, the Illinois Supreme Court would appoint Carey a judge on the Cook County Circuit Court, filling the vacancy left when George M. Marovich was appointed to the federal bench. His appointment was effective on May 5, 1988, and lasted until 1990. The constituency of the judgeship was suburban Cook County. In 1990, Carey won the Republican nomination for the judgeship unopposed, Carey won reelection in the general election.

Death
Carey died of stomach cancer on June 1, 2018 at his retirement home in Naples, Florida. His widow, Mary Rita Carey, disclosed his death to the press on June 4. His widow revealed, after his death, that he had been diagnosed with the stomach cancer in November 2017.

Personal life
Carey had met Mary Rita, who would become his wife, at a church dance social at St. John Fisher in Evergreen Park, Illinois. He died just over a week shy of what would have been their 60th wedding anniversary.

Carey was a longtime resident of South Holland, Illinois. After he retired at the age of 59, he and his wife moved to Florida in 1995.

Carey and his wife had five children. They had ten grandchildren and three great-grandchildren by the time of Carey's death.

Electoral history

Cook County Sheriff
1970

Cook County State's Attorney
1972

1976

1980

President of the Cook County Board of Commissioners

1982

Cook County Commissioner

1982

1986

Illinois Attorney General
1986

Circuit Court of Cook County
1990

References

County commissioners in Illinois
District attorneys in Illinois
Illinois Democrats
Illinois Republicans
Illinois lawyers
2018 deaths
Deaths from cancer in Florida
Deaths from stomach cancer
People from South Holland, Illinois
DePaul University College of Law alumni
Saint Mary's University of Minnesota alumni
De La Salle Institute alumni
Date of birth missing
Judges of the Circuit Court of Cook County